Zgon or Zgoń may refer to:

Zgon, Warmian-Masurian Voivodeship, village in northern Poland
Zgoń, village in southern Poland
Zgon (Ključ), municipality in Bosnia and Herzegovina

See also